The Visitors' Gallery, formally known as the Strangers' Gallery, is set aside for members of the public at the British House of Commons, and is intended for both invited and uninvited members of the public to watch the proceedings of the House. A similar gallery exists in the House of Lords.  Members of the public may obtain tickets from their Member of Parliament. It is possible to queue outside St Stephen's Tower and be admitted to the gallery without booking, especially on Fridays, however during popular debates it will be nearly impossible to obtain a place without booking.  The name refers to the traditional use of the term strangers to refer to those present in Parliament that are neither members nor staff.

The gallery of the House of Commons is located on a level above the floor of the Commons chamber and looks down on it. There is a glass screen at the front of the gallery to prevent the throwing of objects into the chamber. The glass screen was installed in April 2004 at the cost of £600,000.

Other parliaments throughout the Commonwealth have similar facilities, which are known by the same terms.

See also 
 Strangers' Bar

References

External links
Visits to the Gallery of the House of Commons, UK Parliament.

House of Commons of the United Kingdom